Beacon Communications is a privately owned newspaper publisher serving the suburban Rhode Island cities of Cranston, Johnston and Warwick.

Begun in 1969 by John Howell and Anthony Ritacco, as a vehicle to purchase the Warwick Beacon, the company was called Southern Rhode Island Publications until 1987. Howell took sole possession of the company in the 1980s, with Richard Fleischer coming on as the general manager.

Properties 
In addition to its three weekly newspapers, Beacon publishes the Penny$aver shopper in Cranston and Warwick; ChamberWorks, a business publication; and PrimeTime, a seniors-oriented monthly magazine distributed statewide. In 2018, Beacon purchased the weekly shopper publication, the Coventry Reminder. 

Cranston Herald Founded in 1922, the Herald was for a long time run by Rosalie Frost, a former Rockette who in the 1930s became a groundbreaking female journalist. She sold the paper to Beacon shortly after 1973, when the company had started a competing weekly, Cranston Today. The papers were merged under the Herald name. Today's Herald is a paid-subscription Thursday paper. Today, Tim Forsberg serves as editor while Howell remains as publisher.
Johnston Sun Rise Beacon purchased the weekly Johnston Sun Rise in 2006. The paper is set up as a tabloid and is free of charge. It is also edited by Tim Forsberg.
Warwick Beacon The company's flagship publication, the Warwick Beacon, dates back to November 19, 1953. It switched from weekly to twice-weekly publication (currently Tuesdays and Thursdays) in the 1970s. The sports section for the paper is run by a two-person team that also edits the sports section for the Herald. Under the direction of editor Matt Metcalf and assistant editor Jacob Maroco, the department covers a total of seven high schools between the three cities. Howell remains an active reporter for the paper, in addition to his role as editor-in-chief.

Sisters and competitors 
In addition to the former Cranston Today, the company has launched several other complementary products. Beacon founded the Coventry Townsman and Seekonk Sentinel in the early 1970s, later selling them to other owners; and Newport Today (now called Newport This Week).

Beacon's papers compete with The Providence Journal in the state's capital city, which borders Johnston and Cranston.

All three Beacon newspapers are members of Rhode Island Newspaper Group, an advertising sales consortium that consists of five weekly newspaper publishers in suburban Providence. Beacon is the coordinating office for the group; other members are Breeze Publications, East Bay Newspapers, Hathaway Publishing and Southern Rhode Island Newspapers.

References

External links
 Cranston Herald Online
 Warwick Beacon Online

Newspaper companies of the United States
Newspapers published in Rhode Island
Cranston, Rhode Island
Johnston, Rhode Island
Warwick, Rhode Island
Publishing companies established in 1969
1969 establishments in Rhode Island